Osvaldo Heriberto Hurtado Galleguillos (born November 2, 1957) is a Chilean football manager and former player who played as a forward.

Personal life
He is the brother-in-law of the Chilean former international footballer Francisco Ugarte.

References

External links
 

1957 births
Living people
People from Arica
Association football forwards
Chilean footballers
Chile international footballers
Chilean expatriate footballers
1983 Copa América players
1987 Copa América players
1989 Copa América players
Deportes La Serena footballers
Unión Española footballers
Club Deportivo Universidad Católica footballers
O'Higgins F.C. footballers
Cádiz CF players
R. Charleroi S.C. players
Deportes Concepción (Chile) footballers
Club Alianza Lima footballers
San Marcos de Arica footballers
Chilean Primera División players
La Liga players
Ecuadorian Serie A players
Belgian Pro League players
Peruvian Primera División players
Primera B de Chile players
Expatriate footballers in Spain
Chilean expatriate sportspeople in Spain
Expatriate footballers in Ecuador
Chilean expatriate sportspeople in Ecuador
Expatriate footballers in Belgium
Chilean expatriate sportspeople in Belgium
Expatriate footballers in Peru
Chilean expatriate sportspeople in Peru
Chilean football managers
San Marcos de Arica managers
Provincial Osorno managers
Magallanes managers
Primera B de Chile managers